The Beelzebub anime and manga series feature an extensive cast of fictional characters created by Ryūhei Tamura.

Main characters

Oga is first introduced as a strong fighter, beating up some classmates and then making them bow down to him because they had attacked him in his sleep, he is the main protagonist of the anime and manga Beelzebub, but occasionally he can be represented as an anti-hero by his violent nature around Ishiyama and even his friends. It is revealed that he is relaying the story of a series of strange events which leads to his becoming the Earthly father of the son of the devil, Beelzebub IV.  He was picked to become Beelzebub's father because, in the eyes of Alaindelon (see below), who was carrying the baby, he appeared to possess the qualities of the ideal parent for the future Devil King: strong, arrogant, and thinking nothing of his fellow man.

Oga and Beelzebub (nicknamed baby Beel) cannot be separated by more than 15 meters or else it may result in instant death for Oga, according to Hilda  (as of chapter 38, the distance has increased by 8 centimetres). A tattoo-like seal on Oga's right hand, which grows larger the more he fights, signifies the contract between Beelzebub and him, whereby Oga can access large amounts of demonic power. He tries to stop fighting to limit the powers which will ultimately be used to end the human race. However, he is unsuccessful, as his fame of invincibility keeps attracting the attention of other delinquents who seek to conquer him and gain the fame that would come from defeating him.

As the story progresses, the reader learns that Oga is not exactly like the other delinquents in Ishiyama High School. He is certainly a hoodlum, as he relishes the opportunity to fight and seems to take some pride of his reputation of being almost impossible to beat. However, he is not a bully, and does not use his strength to intimidate other people. Also, at first he does not seek fights actively, is not interested in the power struggle that pits Ishiyama's gangs against each other, and does not want to belong to a gang or find underlings of his own. He minds his own business unless provoked, which to his dismay happens all the time.

However, when he learns that the baby will become attached to someone that is both stronger and possessing of the attributes that make the ideal parent, he decides to actively seek confrontation with delinquents who show promise in this regard. This first pits him against the Touhoushinki (see below), but he is disappointed that none of them is able to defeat him. In the process, baby Beel becomes progressively more attached to him and Oga's access to demonic power becomes easier. On defeating Himekawa (see below), he uses for the first time what later becomes his signature attack, the Zebub Blast: a powerful outburst that is strong enough to destroy a building. Later, he becomes able to draw demonic power even without physical contact with baby Beel, and by chapter 84, he uses it consciously for the first time.

Oga's skill is revealed, in the course of the story, to be the consequence of a strong fighting instinct honed by numerous confrontations with other delinquents from an early age. His fame begins at Kata Middle School, when it is told that the mean look in his eyes invited attacks from older students, from which he always came out on top, earning him his first nickname, Mad Dog Oga (by Furuichi). At the end of his 7th grade, he fought alone, and presumably won, against about fifty thugs who had the school under siege.

His exploits at Kata cemented his reputation and at the time of his arrival at Ishiyama as a first-year student, Oga is already known by aliases such as Demon and Raging Ogre, seems to have a lot of enemies from the outset, and makes even more as the series progresses (despite trying not to fight). He also seems to have no friends except for his classmate, Furuichi. He lives with his parents and elder sister (who is an ex-delinquent; it is revealed that she was the first head of the Red Tail gang), though Hilda and Beelzebub have recently moved into his house.

Surprisingly, and often with comical effect, Oga is a decent father figure to Beelzebub. He appears to have his own skewed idea of what a 'man' should be like, and attempts to pass on these ideals to Beel. Despite being called evil by almost every character in the series, he has shown to have a calmer and - if only slightly - warmer side to him, such as when he speaks with Hilda about his position as Beel's parent and assuring Lamia that if Beel ever got ill again he would call her immediately. Despite spending much of the first arc trying to pass Beel on to someone stronger and more evil than him, after all the time they spent together they've formed a close bond, and Oga seems to act more friendly towards Beel.

His long fighting record has made him a formidable enemy: although he has no formal training in martial arts, he is quick enough to dodge attacks from skilled fighters like Kunieda or Shinjou Alex; his agility counterbalances Tojo's heavier build and allows Oga to defeat him; and his resilience enables him to resist most direct hits from Miki and largely evade Kunieda's attacks while only sustaining minimal injuries. Oga is possessing of incredible, near superhuman, strength, even if not heavily built: he is able to send people flying in the air with an effortless punch; most of his opponents are knocked out cold with one hit, often being planted headfirst into the ground, ceiling or walls for comic effect; and in chapter 91 he lifted an enormous boulder off the ground. He comes out of most fights unscathed; and the number of opponents, or how they are equipped, seems to be of little concern to him. Due to him defeating the Touhoushinki and his virtual invincibility, he is considered to be "The King Of Ishiyama", the title given to the school's strongest fighter (Tojo was the "King" until Oga defeated him).

He is able to hold his own against a demon for some time without resort to demon power  (although he did use the Zebub blast against this enemy, it had no effect). He can feel Saotome (see below) using his demon power, which shows he has notable strength for a human. In chapter 75, the Zebub spell temporarily extends up his arm, over his trunk and across his face, giving him a demonic appearance in the eyes of Kiriya. Later, though, upon having to be rescued from a confrontation with a demon by Saotome, he becomes irritated by the fact he is unable to protect anyone and decides to take formal training from Kunieda's grandfather. After teaching Oga the basics, he engages Saotome to instruct the young man on how to tap Beel's demonic powers to their full extent. In chapter 106, he shows his acquired skills for the first time by defeating a demon with a new movement, the Zebub Emblem: after placing a projection of the Fly King Seal onto the intended target, Oga can launch a barrage of punches that cause an enormous amount of energy to accumulate on the victim, later released as a massive explosion. Oga also becomes capable of dissipating the dark aura of energy that demons release when they prepare an attack.

Also as a consequence of his training, Oga develops an extreme attack, comically dubbed Super Milk Time, whereby he drinks Baby Beel's milk as a way of increasing their synchronisation ratio, thus enabling Oga to use Beel's power without limit. As a result, he can unleash a frantic, wild attack that can overwhelm even Saotome. As a trade-off, Oga and Beel's mentalities and bodies coalesce and Saotome has warned Oga that allowing himself to run on this state for longer than five minutes may overtax him physical and mentally to the point that he will lose his humanity. He goes on to train under Ikaruga Suiten (see below) in order to keep this process under control.

As with most thugs in the series, he lacks any particular technique in fighting, mostly relying on his natural prowess to diminish the advantage of trained martial artists like Kunieda and Miki. However, he has figured out some classical techniques from wrestling: he defeats Tojo with a suplex and leads baby Beel in a Clothesline, an Elbow drop and a Boston crab. Later, not wanting to be looked down on by Miki (see below), he starts to invent nonsensical names for his punches and kicks, so that they will sound more respectable like the elaborate movements of trained fighters. However, his immense strength and agility mean that even basic techniques may become quite destructive in his hands. So far, he has learned one specialized movement, Nadeshiko, from Grandpa Kunieda, and in only one day's training became capable of using it to split massive rocks with ease. On his return from training with Suiten, he begins to show superhuman agility and strength similar to Saotome's, and a fine control of Beel's power that allows him to face demons as easily as delinquents.

Oga is also pretty honourable by delinquents' standards. Although he has no qualms about humiliating petty thugs who pick fights with him, e.g. by making them bow down to him, he respects his opponents of more consequence. In the case of Tojo, for example, after having won the fight against him, Oga is willing to have everyone leave the scene quickly to let Tojo brood over his defeat in peace. He is also quick to acknowledge other people's strength or courage.

Oga's fighting record is not only of clear-cut victories. When caught by surprise or lacking motivation, or unwilling to fight, Oga can be pushed back if the enemy is strong or agile enough, as in his first confrontation with Tojo (who managed to land a punch on him when Oga got distracted by his tattoo) and Aizawa (who attacked from behind). Skilled martial artists like Miki and Kunieda may lack the strength to knock him out, but can come out of a fight against Oga largely unharmed by repeatedly evading or pushing him back. The only humans who have been able thoroughly to defeat Oga are Grandpa Kunieda and Saotome Zenjuurou.
 
Oga is easily agitated and does not avoid fighting. However, he also seems to care, at least to some degree, about his classmates, as he quickly stopped Nene when she was about to fight Miki, telling her she would lose if she did. Oga, along with Furuichi, is an avid fan of the video game series Dragon Quest, and regularly makes references to the series in the manga.

In a twisted manner, Oga is able to show some affection for his friends. For example, he misses Furuichi during holidays and uses Alaindelon to kidnap him from a five-star resort, if only to annoy him. He also resorts to the extreme measure of badly beating Miki up in order to prevent him from taking part in a fight against Kiriya and his gang (see below). At the end of the manga he is trusted to care for Beel's little sister Nico.

He is the youngest son of the Devil King. He is very attached to Oga, always clinging onto Oga's back or sitting on Oga's head. When he becomes agitated (and initially when he saw blood), he'll often throw a tantrum that will spontaneously electrocute anyone within his vicinity. Without Oga, he is physically weaker than even the average human child, but contact with Oga allows him to unleash his demonic powers. After fearing for Oga's safety when he contracted a fever (as his power would end up killing Oga), he severed the contract and ran away. He then became somewhat attached to Tojo, who resembles Oga (at least in his own mind). Later, when Oga and Tojo start to fight, Beel snaps out of his fever and goes back to Oga. At that point, their mutual trust becomes so great that Beel even erases the Zebub spell to allow Oga to fight Tojo without using demonic powers.

Beelzebub's characteristic cry is "Daabū!" and he is always naked with a pacifier in his mouth (in the Animax Asia airing of the anime, he wears a diaper). He, like Oga, is shown to anger easily, yet his outbursts are portrayed in a more comical fashion. He, like other demons, is able to sense when a human is particularly strong, and this first leads him to take a liking to Kunieda. Later, when she learns how to use demonic powers, Beel becomes even more attached to her. He has also shown to have some liking to Tojo, who appears to remind him of Oga. When Oga reunites with Miki, Beel showed immediate disgust and possible fear toward the Saint Ishiyama Student. The reason for this has not been stated.

In the demon world, the extent of Beel's true power is finally known when he strikes down a gigantic monster bird in one hit and later defeats a monster larger than a mountain under Oga's direction.

Through the series (so far covering a period of about six months), he shows some development, as expected from an infant, and his ability to interact with other people increases. He and Kunieda's little brother Kouta (see below) develop a rivalry, with comic effect. Beel's power increases as he ages and so does Oga's, but the process is accelerated when both undergo training to allow Oga to control his possession by Beel.

His name is borrowed from a semitic deity that was incorporated as a demon by Abrahamic religions.

Preferring to be called by a shorter name, Hilda is a demon maid who helps Oga take care of Beelzebub IV. She reveres the Devil, or Demon Lord, and feels that it is a great honour to be chosen as the child's "Mother", or caretaker, by the Demon Lord. Her most characteristic features include her Gothic Lolita appearance and (as pointed out by Oga's mother) "great big knockers." Hilda is also described as a bombshell, and her right eye is green. The left eye was only revealed in chapter 186, and is normally hidden behind a fringe of hair. That is because it shows moving things at one tenth of their normal speed and captures even minute objects; thus, if both eyes are working together for a long time, Hilda becomes nauseated by the discrepancy between them.

Hilda rides a flying, leathery creature known as an AK-Baba as transportation and owns an umbrella which conceals a sword in the handle. Oga's family is under the impression that Oga and Hilda had sex and that Beelzebub was the result. After the fight with Tojo, she seems to accept Oga raising Baby Beel and becomes warmer towards him.

Despite being blunt and cold most of the time, she has been shown to have a kinder side that comes out from time to time, often at the surprise and/or disbelief of the other characters. Being a demon herself, she is quite knowledgeable about the demon world, being able to successfully navigate Oga and company through Vlad's Haunt. She takes being Beel's mother quite seriously and even goes as far as to state that it was the only reason for her existence. As a fighter she is quite skilled. Her skills gained her the nickname "Oga Bride" at Ishiyama, as she dispatches her enemies in a similar manner to Oga (e.g., shoving her opponents' heads into walls). In the anime, she has developed an interest in watching soap opera, much to Oga's disbelief. Her name comes from the Old High German name "Hildegard" meaning Hild (=war or battle) and Gard (=protection) and means "protecting battle-maid".

Hilda and Oga's rapport is pragmatic for the most part. Hilda often looks down on him and never hesitates to mock him, but at the same time acknowledges his strength and allies with him in Beel's interest. In turn, he finds her cold and manipulative personality annoying, but does follow her advice. However, it is shown on rare occasions that they do care about each other and work extremely well together in a fight.

Initially in the manga, Hilda was probably the most powerful of the series' protagonists, as she was able to, for a short time, fight with Saotome while Oga, Tojou, and Izuma were taken out instantly by the teacher. When she becomes serious in a fight, she becomes surrounded by a pure black aura, which she then channels into her sword for a powerful attack. It is implied that, as with Beel, her full-fledged powers are much greater than what she is able to show in the human world, but she would need a human contractor to access them. She is considered to be the very elite among demon wet nurses, and is able to defeat Lord En's three maids single-handedly (see below). More recently, though, Oga may have surpassed her by learning to use Beel's powers. Kunieda (see below) may also have become a match for Hilda after seemingly having trained to improve her sword skill and procuring help from Koma and Ikaruga Nazuna (see below). Just recently her age was revealed to be 16.

Another first year at Ishiyama, Furuichi seems to be the only non-delinquent student there and has little, if any, fighting ability. He often points out the absurdities in Oga's situation, acting as the rational and most passive member of the group. Furuichi often complains about Oga, stating that just because he hangs around with him, people take him for a delinquent as well. He is the eldest child of his family, which seems to be wealthier than Oga's, since they are able to spend summer holidays in a five-star resort. He is also implied to be quite a good student, and Miki says that his grades would have easily earned him a place in Saint Ishiyama School. He is a prototypical lovelorn teenager and is always scheming to ingratiate himself with the fair sex, to little avail: most women - human and demon alike - around are stronger than he, and many moments of comic relief in the series arise when Furuichi has his advances on girls frustrated. He envies Oga for being the object of Kunieda's love and for having Hilda under the same roof (see below).
 
He is very conscious of his own weakness and will not stand up to thugs, although he is quick to do an about-face when a pretty girl is involved. At these junctures, he shows considerable strategy and is even ruthless, for example using baby Beel to electrocute several enemies in a pool, suggesting a different but no less evil commonality with Oga.

Furuichi and Oga seem to be reciprocal only friends, and the former is often the one that Oga goes to for conversation. He is comically referred to as "idiot Furuichi" by Oga, and is often the victim of many jokes in the story, although he is shown to have a darker side to him as well: Furuichi is not above returning to Oga some of the distress he is involved in because of him, and does not mind having Oga electrocuted as collateral damage in the episode described above. Their mutual loyalty is very fierce: Oga becomes riled up when Himekawa kidnaps and manhandles his friend, and Furuichi does not refrain from standing on Oga's side in tight spots, and even to put himself in danger to help him. Furuichi quickly (if reluctantly) forgives him for kidnapping him from his holiday resort. Like Oga, he is a fan of Dragon Quest. He has a younger sister, Honoka.

The story of how such disparate characters got along is eventually told. It turns out that Oga sees Furuichi as being very strong, but in a different way: in order to earn Oga's trust when they were ten years old, Furuichi resisted Oga's strikes multiple times, always getting back on his feet, something that had never happened before. This and Furuichi disregard for the danger around Oga's fights have cemented their friendship, and Oga holds Furuichi's judgement in high regard.

In chapter 174, Behemoth (see below) wonders about Furuichi's ability to channel demonic power, despite the fact that Furuichi seems to be only a normal human.

A dimensional transfer demon working under Hildegarde, he is first seen floating down the river with an arrow on his chest. He sees Oga forcing other delinquents to kneel before him and decides to deliver baby Beel to him as a potential parent. He is heavily built and is most often seen wearing a tank-top and boxer-shorts. After Oga becomes Beel's parent he moves in with Furuichi, against the boy's wishes. It is revealed in Chapter 42 that he has a daughter, but in the course of the story he also displays homosexual affection for Furuichi, much to the latter's chagrin. These tendencies are exaggerated in the anime.

He is supposed to be a satirical representation of the singer Freddie Mercury and is named after French actor Alain Delon; his appearances are often used for comic effect. Despite that, he is considered highly competent by Hilda, both as an assistant and a transdimensional demon: he is one of few who are capable of transporting two people at once and is able to recover from injuries in little time; his power is such that he can use a communicator as a homing device and send a person to the corresponding location. Alaindelon often advises Hilda about Oga and Beel. Both demons later join St. Ishiyama disguised as students in order to try to identify demons hiding in the school (see below).

Ishiyama High
Ishiyama is described as "the hoodlum school": with the exception of Furuichi, all students are delinquents who spend most of the time fighting. It is accidentally destroyed by Oga on chapter 37.

Tōhōshinki

The four leaders of the delinquent forces in Ishiyama High. In the English subtitled version of the anime by Crunchyroll, the abbreviation TKKH (using the first letters of their surnames) is used. While initially introduced as antagonists early in the series, the four later become Oga's most loyal followers, each gaining the King's Emblem (located on different parts of their body) that allows them to tap into Beelzebub's demon powers during fights to a level that allows them to go toe-to-toe with other demon contract holders.

The first of the four to be introduced, he was the closest to dominating the school at the time. A sadistic and malignant third year, he was sought out by Oga to be a replacement father for Beel, Oga hoping Kanzaki's purportedly sinister and malicious character would be more appealing to the demon baby than his own. However, after Kanzaki viciously humiliates Shiroyama, his most loyal underling and until then his right-hand man, Oga becomes enraged and punches Kanzaki through a top-story window, sending him to the hospital and further solidifying Beel's attachment to him. After that, Kanzaki loses his retinue, save for Shiroyama and Natsume (see below). He later consorted with Himekawa and Oga in order to pull down the powerful Tojo, but gets caught up with Himekawa in a fight against Tojo's underlings and is sent to the hospital again due to injuries contracted in the explosion that destroyed the school.

Later he begins to reciprocate the loyalty of his remaining subordinates - now better described as friends -, such as when he goes to get revenge for Shiroyama after he is beaten up by St. Ishiyama High students, and his character evolves in a more likable fashion. At St. Ishiyama, he seeks to preserve the reputation of the Ishiyama students against the advances of the six Horsemen (see below), and starts to show some loyalty to Oga and the others. His considerable and unwarranted pride is often depicted in comical fashion, such as when he intervenes to relieve Tojo, who is much stronger than he is, in a fight against a demon.

His fighting style is raw and brutal, and does not appear to have any technique, but is effective against the average thug. Even after being defeated by Oga, his reputation as a Tōhōshinki persists and he is greatly feared by lesser delinquents. It is implied that his family is wealthy and/or influential, and that he pushed that influence to achieve his status as a gang leader. On chapter 143, the reader learns that Kanzaki is indeed the second son of a yakuza family and has a little niece from his brother.

He wears a small chain hanging from his left ear and from a piercing below his mouth. It is revealed that Kanzaki becomes enraged if someone pulls the chain and in these occasions he becomes three times stronger than normal. Nevertheless, after being defeated by Oga, he was gradually displaced in the scale of strength, to the point of being harshly beaten by the Poltergeists in chapter 193 (see below). However, he was then branded with a secondary Zebub Spell, effectively becoming Beel's first human knight, and proceeded to defeat all of his opponents single-handedly.

Kanzaki's most devoted underling. A strong, tall third-year, he is nevertheless easily defeated by Oga with a single shot to the chin. Even after his humiliation by Kanzaki and the dissolution of the latter's gang, he remains attached to Kanzaki. Later, when he is sent to the hospital by St. Ishiyama students, Kanzaki visits upon him. He escapes the hospital to support Ishiyama against the Horsemen in the volleyball match, but is taken back by the staff. He is often seen acting as Kanzaki's voice of reason.

A soft-spoken, third-year student and an underling of Kanzaki, he shows exceptional interest in Oga and his exploits. Handsome and long-haired, he prefers to make lighthearted quips during frays to engaging in them personally. Though he rarely participates in fights himself, he is incredibly strong, taking out the MK5 by himself and even downing one of Tojo's underlings within seconds. From this it is implied that Natsume is significantly stronger than previously credited, as not even Kanzaki or Himekawa were capable of such a feat. He shows these fighting skills again when he blocks Gou Hiromichi from attacking Oga head on, later stating during their fight, "it's not really my style to go all out in a fight."

He is the son of the "Himekawa Group", a financial zaibatsu, a third-year student and the second member of the Tohoshinki. Using money to solve his problems, he bribes friends and enemies into his employment, often turning the tables on dissident challengers by co-opting their own friends against them. This tactic proved completely useless on Oga, and Himekawa was the first victim of the Zebub Blast. Following his recovery, he groups himself together with Oga and Kanzaki in order to remove Tojo from power, but is caught up in the explosion with Kanzaki and most of the student body. He has a slightly outlandish appearance, including his hair in Pompadour hairstyle and his constant use of sunglasses, most often complete with a Hawaii shirt. For comedic effect, he is shown to be quite handsome without his glasses and with his hair brushed down, which makes him look like a completely different person.

Although a capable fighter, Himekawa uses underhanded tactics to prevail, such as having his opponents break their fists by punching a ceramic tile shield hidden under his shirt, or electrocuting them with a shock-baton (both are shown to be useless against Oga). In his first appearance, he resorted to outright criminal acts to lure Oga, such as kidnapping Furuichi and threatening to kill him and Hilda. He behaved quite viciously towards her, shooting her garments multiple times with a water gun filled with acid in search of a mobile phone.

After losing his gang and later at St. Ishiyama, his character also evolves in a more positive fashion. Like Kanzaki, he starts to show some loyalty to his colleagues, especially to Oga, even stopping an attack by Sakaki Mitsuteru against an unarmed Kunieda. His strategic skills prove useful when he clinches a deal with St. Ishiyama's teachers to prevent his and his colleagues' expulsion. He is also the source of outside information regarding other gangs and always seems to be in the knowing of what is going on outside the classroom. It is revealed in chapter 135 that he has abnormal puzzle-solving skills.

Even for the standards of upper class families, Himekawa is granted extravagant means by his family: his pocket money, for example is enough to acquire the proprietor rights over an Internet game. He used to live in a multiple-story elite condominium penthouse he purchased with his and his friend Kugayama's (see below) winnings in Internet wager games, but it got destroyed by Oga.

In contrast to the other Touhoushinki, none of his underlings can be called his friend, and he was left completely alone after his defeat at Oga's hands. However, he garnered some respect from the others after helping out in the search for Lord En (see below). Aside from that, he is sometimes seen with a young butler called Hasui, who is the only person who calls him by his given name. He is revealed to be the fourth person with a Zebub Symbol, only he is actually the 3rd Knight.

Aoi is 17 years old, a second-year student and the third leader of the "strongest ladies of Kantou", the Red Tails. She is first introduced in disguise at the park taking care of her baby brother, Kouta, who is constantly mistaken as being Aoi's own child by the mothers at the park. She is the daughter of a local shrine keeper. Her nickname is Queen because she is the protector of all the girls at Ishiyama High from the men's "grubby hands". Because of Oga's dense personality, he has yet to realize that the girl he befriended at the park that Oga knows as "Aoi Kunie" and Kunieda are one and the same. Despite her tough personality, she has a rather girlish crush on Oga but refuses to admit this fact to others. She can feel Saotome using his demon power, which shows she has notable strength for a human.

Aoi differs from the other thugs at Ishiyama in that she has formal martial arts training from her grandfather, the master of the shingetsu style. She is also not a bully, and steers the leadership of the Red Tails towards preventing unnecessary fights in the school. This is what puts her first in collision course with Oga, as the latter is deemed by her to be responsible for most of recent violent events in the school. They have two exchanges: in neither does Oga return her attacks, limiting himself to evade them, first to let baby Beel assess her strength and thus find out whether she is a potential replacement for him; later, because a failure in communication leads Oga to believe that Aoi's condition to take Beel is that he should resist her charges. She is greatly impressed by Oga's speed and power, and misunderstands his advances on her (to get rid of Beel) as romantic interest. After he saves her from a plot by the MK5, she decides to leave the Red Tails and become a more disciplined person, and at the same time her crush on Oga increases. Later, she and the Red Tails intervene to stop the whole male student body of Ishiyama from attacking Oga, allowing him to proceed to a confrontation with Tojo unhindered.

She at first harboured some jealousy against Hilda, seeing her as a potential rival for Oga, but on discovering the truth about her and Baby Beel's true nature, their animosity becomes less pronounced. Later, it is Hilda who becomes jealous of Beel's attachment to Aoi.

She is a skilled swordswoman and martial artist, and possesses an immense amount of vitality and stamina, as well as impressive speed that is above Sakaki Mitsuteru's, who is known to be able to wield his sword at 250 km/h (however, she is not fast enough to hit Oga, who manages to evade even her best attacks with minor injuries). She can use any weapon she chooses in battle, and has even been shown to fight with nothing more than a ruler. She has shown the ability to assess opponents' strengths and weaknesses very quickly. Despite all this however, Hilda has noted that Aoi is still below Oga's level in terms of battle capabilities.

After being targeted by demons, she and Oga went on a training trip with her grandfather to improve their fighting skills. She then requested for advice on how to exorcise demons from her friend Isafuyu (see below). After training, she and Hilda fight again, and this time Kunieda proves to be a match for the demon maid. Hilda then notices that Kunieda has somehow learned to use demonic powers herself. It is later explained that Kunieda forged an alliance with a minor deity, Koma (see below), and becomes able to release demonic power, as sensed by Beel and Hilda. She become's the second of Beel's Knights, gaining her Zebub Symbol on her chest during her fight with Ringo.

A first-year and leading member of the Red Tails. Chiaki rarely speaks and dispatches her enemies swiftly with a pair of modified air-guns hidden under her skirt (actually, she can use up to four guns at the same time). She is very loyal to Kunieda even after she leaves the gang, and is ready to shoot anyone other than Oga who makes advances on her. She is the first to recognise that Kunieda is in love with Oga and thinks it very cute, as opposed to Nene (see next). She is an expert video game player, often playing with her little brother, and Kanzaki gives her the nickname "Akichi" (an inversion of the syllables of her name) to signify her gaming persona.

Originally Kunieda Aoi's second-in-command, Nene is far more aggressive than her permissive leader. Though she often openly disagrees with and occasionally disobeys Kunieda, she is still her faithful wingman, balking vociferously when Kunieda opts to leave the Red Tails and relinquish the mantle of leadership to her. She takes it nevertheless and soon proves to be worthy of it, gaining the confidence and trust of the Red Tails as their fourth leader. Her weapon of preference are chains, which she uses proficiently to gain an advantage against stronger men. As Kunieda, she is a second-year student.

A first-year student and a talkative member of the Red Tails who often makes embarrassing statements. She has long hair that is always adorned with a flower-shaped hairpin that can be used as a dagger. As a member of the Red Tails, she is a very good fighter and is not afraid of facing men. Lately, she and Kanzaki have been getting along, beginning when both witnessed Tojo's fight with a demon. In some recent chapters, it is lightly implied that she might have feelings for Kanzaki.

The fourth, and by far the strongest, Tōhōshinki (his strength in comparison to Kunieda is not confirmed, though it can be implied that he is stronger than she indirectly thought from their other fights). He is introduced how a main antagonist in the anime and a third-year student, Tojo has an unexpected soft side towards smaller creatures and babies, though said creatures do not feel similarly towards him. He is mostly bored with weaklings and is always looking for a good fight, which subsequently leads to his interest towards Oga. He works multiple jobs and sometimes has to miss school because of them. He can feel Saotome using his demon power, which shows he has notable strength for a human. His fighting style is a rigid brutal force. He appears to possess an incredible amount of stamina, as he was able to take a full blow from Miki without so much as flinching. Tojo presents an immediate threat to anyone he faces and has shown a strong willingness to fight, even at the expense of his own body. He is also called by the nickname Tora by his friends.

His main adversary thus far has been Oga, and although he does show a certain amount of respect for him, it is clear that the battles they share are the only things that matter to him. Tojo is stronger and more resilient, but Oga is more agile and has a superior technique. They have had three skirmishes so far: in the first one, Oga was gaining the upper hand but got distracted by Tojo's tattoo and was sent flying (although the punch failed to knock him out - the first time someone resisted a punch by Tojo). In the second, Oga defeated him fair and square, if narrowly, after a protracted fight. Contrarily to Himekawa and Kanzaki, Tojo is very honourable and promptly acknowledges his defeat. Later his fighting skill increased and when they have a third, amicable fight, it ended in a draw.

He appears to know Nanami Shizuka, the female member of the Horsemen, quite well. She referred to him as Tora when they met after the volleyball match, and both went searching for Saotome afterwards.

He looks up to Saotome Zenjuurou (see below), and has copied the latter's royal seal in the form of a tattoo in order to resemble him. Contrarily to Oga, he actively seeks to fight against progressively stronger opponents, and has his eyes currently on Izuma (see below) and demons. However, he is not a bully and shows no real interest in attracting followers as Himekawa and Kanzaki. He tends to be more aloof in class, although he does show loyalty towards his colleagues. He and Oga are the only humans so far to have been able temporarily to hold their ground against demons without resort to demonic powers of their own.

After being nearly killed by a demon, Tojo receives basic instructions from Saotome on how to tackle this kind of adversary, and the teacher states that he is safe to improve his skill if left to his own devices, as Tojo's fighting is mostly driven by instinct. When he appears again, he begins to show superhuman strength and speed on par with Oga's, but the origin of those hasn't been explained. He is the third person revealed to be one of Beel's Knights, with his symbol appearing on his upper arm. His number, however, is 4.

Kaoru Jinno

A long-haired, third-year underling of Tojo's. He has a calm attitude and is shown to be bookish, but is nevertheless a strong fighter, being able to defeat Himekawa and Kanzaki on his own easily.

Shoji Aizawa

Tojo's right-hand man and a third-year student. He wears sunglasses and has a cool attitude, and is a strong fighter. He has been able to evade one of Oga's attacks and even fight him briefly, although Oga had been taken by surprise. He and Kaoru are caught in the destruction of Ishiyama High and later share a hospital room with Kanzaki, Shiroyama and Himekawa.

Six Killer Elements
Also known as "Ishiyama's Six Upstarts", they are six first-years who make their appearance at Ishiyama when it is finally rebuilt. Each one leads their own gang. During the period when the students were scattered among different schools, they seem to have grown strong and confident enough to challenge Oga and the Tōhōshinki for the leadership of the school. They are divided in two tiers: the Three Kings and, above them, the Three Beasts.

The Three Kings
Kankurō Akahoshi
The former leader of Hiaburi High School, his battle name is "Fan that dyes everything blood red", and his coat has the picture of a fan on its backside. Other than the hairstyle, he resembles Oga quite closely in physical appearance. Despite being the lowest-ranked of the Elements, he is quite proud and confident, and has declared that he will beat Oga fair and square to take his place as king of the school. His number two is Ryou Haizawa, a third year; and his number three is Shigeru Shigemori, a second-year. He is the contractor of one of the Seven Sins, Mammon

Houjou Ringo
The only woman in the group. She was a former Red Tail under Aoi's leadership, but now has formed her own group at Majougari Academy, calling themselves the New World Red Tails. Her class and year are still unclear: she is described as a first year, but also as the second leader of the Red Tails before Kunieda. In their first clash with Aoi, the latter refused to fight back against former comrades and suffered minor injuries. Houjou is nicknamed "Tabako", since she is often smoking. Her numbers two and three are third-years Maaya Ajari and Yukino Kagemiya, respectively.

Ebian Ichikawa
Formerly the head of Sabatou High, and known as "Blind Swordsman" due to a scar that keeps his left eye permanently shut, he is a bulky, bald man who is constantly scowling and who sports a moustache. He wears a dark suit with a scarf and carries a flower on his mouth, resulting in a slightly outlandish appearance. He is described as temperamental and describes Beel as "cute" on first seeing him. His weapon of choice is a sword and, like Aoi, he can cut through concrete with it. His numbers two and three are third-years Souken Chabou and Tetsuhito Kajiura, respectively.

Three Beasts
Yōhei Nasu
The former head of Sourei High and nicknamed as "Aubergine" (the meaning of the kanji that form his name), "Nasubi" is a tall, blond man of dishevelled appearance and who behaves condescendingly against opponents, even calling Oga "Lil' Oga". He is strong enough not only to take Oga's wall-burying punch but to easily detach himself from the wall, breaking it in the process. He and his gang members formed a musical group called The Poltergeists: Masao Onizuka, a tall third-year who used to fight Toujou and be the "ki" in the Tōhōshinki before Himekawa, is the pianist; Teruomi Hino, a second-year who wears a mask, is the trumpeter; Seiji Kamayama, a dark-haired second-year, is the bassist; and Taizō Shiori, an obese third-year, is the drummer.
On their first encounter, Nasu tells Oga he is going to steal Beel from him, and indeed seems to be very interested in the baby. It is eventually revealed that Nasu, like Saotome (see below) is a Spellmaster, and quite an advanced one at that. He is defeated by Oga and Beel, while his henchmen are beaten by Kanzaki. He is part of a larger conspiracy which seems to be targeting Baby Beel. He is the third Beast.

Shinobu Takamiya
The former leader of Daten High and the second Beast, he is the contractor of Lucifer. He led a gang called Fallen Angels.

Fuji
He is the contractor of one of the Seven Sins, Satan.

Others
MK5
Named "Majide Kuukiyomenai 5 ningumi" [translation: The Unbelievably Tactless 5], this gang was suspended from school and is famous for its immense cruelty and poor hygiene. They always sport neckties and make a point of appearing in choreographic fashion, often with comical effects. Despite this, they are relatively weak in comparison to most of the other characters and have yet to win a single fight; they are almost always quickly defeated in an instant. They are distinct from most other thugs in that they use firearms loaded with actual bullets, and have even gone so far as to try to eliminate Nene Oomori. Members consist of:

: Short, snarky, and black-haired. The acting leader.
: Marked by a heart-shaped tattoo on his face. Uses a pistol.
: Bald and scarred. Uses nunchuks.
: Chapeaued and bespectacled. Carries a rifle.
: Immense, muscular, and has long hair.

Better known as "Good Night Shimokawa", he is a second-year thug who has a crush on Kunieda and is one of the first to be defeated by Oga. His nickname derives from his constant use of "Good night" to address people.

Saint Ishiyama Academy

Oga and his friends were transferred to Saint Ishiyama Academy, the sister school of Ishiyama High, when the latter was destroyed. They are not welcome however, as the school is unwilling to adopt the delinquents. The group is constantly harassed by the students of the school, but they are not the only problem. The school of Saint Ishiyama Academy has a force within it that upholds the rules of conduct. They are six captains of different sports teams and groups/clubs who possess an extraordinary amount of strength and fighting experience. They have set out to get rid of Oga and his friends, and are backed by an unfair rule that allows them to carry out "judgement" on any person or party within the student body. The six knights challenged Oga and his friends to a sports competition (after a huge fight on the rooftops of Saint Ishiyama). The wager of the battle was clear: if Oga and his friends won, they would not be expelled. Himekawa also managed to clinch a deal with the teacher in charge of student life, whereby if the six knights lost the competition they would be stripped of their authority and privileges. In the end, Ishiyama came out on top.

Six Holy Knights

The only first-year student of Saint Ishiyama to become a member of the Six Knights. He is the captain of the Karate team and a master of Hakkyokuken, as well as an advanced practitioner of the fictional Izuma-style martial arts. He is very strong, being able to take down Kanzaki with a single punch. Miki knows Oga from middle school, where Oga (intentionally or not) saved Miki from a group of high school delinquents. Wanting to become stronger, he started to hang around Oga, but later realized that this would not make him any stronger, because no matter what kind of fight he was dragged into, Oga Tatsumi took care of everything. However, when they meet again at St. Ishiyama, he appears to hold deep feelings of contempt towards Oga and to be obsessed with proving to his former classmate how strong he has become.

The origin of Miki's grudge against Oga is later told. Miki used to hang out with Oga and Furuichi and longed to be accepted as a friend by them. One night, Miki found himself in a tight spot when he tried to recover a charm given to him by his father from a group of middle school thugs led by Kiriya Reiji, who gave him his double scar in the left cheek. At the occasion, Oga helped Miki out and used Kiriya's own nails to carve a triple scar across his face. Later, Miki found that Oga, without telling him, was being constantly harassed by Kiriya and his underlings who wanted revenge. Miki went after Oga to offer to fight along him, but Oga shunned him coldly, purporting not even to know his friend. Still, Miki thought Oga just wanted to keep him from harm, especially as Miki was about to move to Nara with his mother. One afternoon, however, when Kiriya's gang surrounded Kata Middle School after Oga, Miki decided to join him. At this point, Oga lashed out, viciously beating and humiliating him in front of everybody. Miki then became severely resentful of Oga and decided to become better than he at fighting, in order eventually to beat him.

However, when Kiriya holds St. Ishiyama hostage three years later to get his own revenge against Oga, he casually reveals to Miki that he moved with his family to Nara at the same time as Miki, who finally realises the truth: Oga was aware that Kiriya and Miki would live in the same area and that, if Miki, who had no fighting skill at the time, had taken part in the fight against Kiriya, the latter would have retaliated against him in a treacherous manner later. Therefore, Oga decided to sever ties with Miki, and even to beat him up in front of Kiriya, in order to shift attention off him.  In this he succeeded: Kiriya did not go after Miki while both were living at Nara and actually did not remember him at all when they met again.

When Miki realises this, all animosity against Oga vanishes and the two fight back to back against Kiriya. From that point on, Oga, who had refrained to acknowledge their former acquaintance, begins to use Miki's name, and the latter begins to try to get close to his former friend again.

Miki's fighting record is mixed. Having been thoroughly trained in martial arts, he relies on his agility to evade Oga's attacks, and is one of very few people to come out of a fight with him unscathed. However, most of his own attacks, although strong enough to take down Kanzaki, fail to have much of an effect on stronger thugs like Oga and Tojo. The Izuma style finisher (the Black Owl Killer) is strong enough to take down Oga in one hit, but it must be stressed that Oga actually intended to take the blow to measure Miki's strength, and made no effort to dodge or counter it. In Miki's own estimation, in that occasion he couldn't claim to have beaten Oga, mainly because executing the Black Owl Killer on him before having perfected the move damaged his hands badly to the point of bleeding. It is worth noting that Oga, though certainly incapable of retaliating, was not knocked out and was able to stand up on his feet soon afterwards, even though the move was supposed to send the victim to the hospital. Miki's own resilience does not seem particularly high, as he was quite affected by two hits from Teimou's shadow forces (see below), and was saved from further injury by Oga. By that point, though, he had perfected the Black Owl Killer and performed it to devastating effect on Kosei Kuroki (see below).

Despite being one of the six people who can feel Saotome using his powers, and therefore possessing of notable strength for a human, it is unclear whether Miki knows of the demon world, as he has not had any contact with demons. However, it is later learned that he is training with Izuma in preparation for a confrontation with the 34th Pillar Squad.

The leader of the six knights, Miki's teacher, the master of the Izuma dojo and until recently the student council president. A third-year, he is shown to be the strongest of its members, holding a great deal of authority over the group. Izuma is the descendant of a demon who escaped to the human world and he was taken up by Saint Ishiyama's headmaster upon losing his place in society for showing his powers in a previous school. As such, he can also release the dark aura seen in full demons, though apparently in lower levels.

He is often shown to oscillate between a calm and controlled attitude and a positive thirst for death. He has shown considerable authority, not only among students, but with the faculty members other than the headmaster as well, and is behind the initiative to challenge Ishiyama students for a volleyball match. During the match, he uses his martial style technique to send killer serves, but is eventually defeated by Kunieda. When Oga uses the Zebub Blast against Kiriya, he recognises the use of demonic powers and arranges a quick cover-up to prevent Oga from being exposed. In a later conversation, the headmaster reveals to him that Oga may be a target to demons, but it is not known whether he knows about baby Beel's being the Demon Lord's son. He can feel Saotome using his demon power, which shows he has notable strength for a human. In chapter 178, it is implied that he has feelings for Shizuka.

Izuma's fighting ability is superior to that of the other Knights and on par with Tojo's and Oga's. However, contrarily to them, he is taken down with ease by a demon and is saved from certain death by Tojo's intervention. Afterwards, he also set out to train in order to become capable of facing this kind of enemy.

His heritage is still unknown but it is clear that he has some Spanish heritage. He is a second-year at Saint Ishiyama High with light wavy hair. The captain of the boxing club, he is regarded as the second best high school boxer in the nation and is known to finish all matches with a one-hit knockout of the opponent. He also plays the piano. As of chapter 177, he has replaced Kaname Izuma as student council president.

At first, he shows contempt for Ishiyama's students and seeks a confrontation with Oga in the first opportunity. At the point, Oga's thoughts are of forcing baby Beel on him; knowing that fighting back means expulsion, he decides to take Alex' punches at first, while testing him with trivia questions in order to show baby Beel that he is not only strong but clever, with comic effect.

Alex is strong enough to defeat the MK5 with ease. However, he is no match for Oga: his punches fail to knock him out at first; later, Oga easily evades them and even stops one with his hand. When he finally evokes a reaction from Oga, the latter deals him a defeat similar to the ones Alex is known to deal to others: a one-hit knockout.

Sakaki is a second-year like Shinjou. He has long black hair that is usually kept in a ponytail. He is usually seen in his standard Ishiyama uniform and is the least talkative of the knights. He is the captain of the kendo team.

Sakaki is a very skilled swordsman and is able to cut a few hairs of Kunieda's with a wooden sword. However, he is not in her league: Kunieda is able to cut his sword with a ruler, to Sakaki's shock. He then begins to believe her the strongest of the Ishiyama students and longs to have a rematch with her. He even goes to the length of attacking her when she is unarmed and unwilling to fight back, but is stopped by Himekawa. The two men then fight and seem reasonably well matched, with Himekawa coming out in a slightly worse condition.

Later, Sakaki begins to show some attraction to Kunieda, and her toughness leads him to consider her a tsundere character.

Go is a muscular third-year. He is the captain of the radio club and participates in international ARDF competitions. He is ruthless and actively seeks fights, and attacked out of impulse once Miki admitted that Oga was the strongest of the four who showed up for the rooftop fights. His advance was intercepted by Shintarou Natsume and the two had a reasonably matched fight.

She is an attractive, red-haired third-year, the only female member of the six knights, the captain of the archery team and until recently the student council vice-president. She seems to have a strong relationship with Izuma as she is able to joke and laugh with him, something the other horsemen seem unable to do (likely due to their fear of him). She is seen massaging Izuma's back after their volleyball training session. She knows Tojo from the past and calls him Tora, and both are longing to meet Saotome Zenjuurou. Her actual fighting skill is yet undetermined, but Kunieda was surprised that she could reach the rooftop undetected by her, and both girls rose up to help Oga and Miki against Teimou, which indicates Shizuka is as unafraid of physical combat against men as Kunieda. She can feel Saotome using his demonic powers, which shows she has notable strength for a human. Shizuka has three siblings, two boys and a girl, the eldest of whom seems to look up to Tojo. It is heavily implied that she has feelings for him, but is content for now with being his friend.

Others

A first year student who looks up to thugs and gangs and wants to become a delinquent himself. He deeply admires Oga as the best hoodlum around and their first contact is when Oga and Kunieda save him and his friend Azusa from harassment by Teimou students. He then kowtows to Oga and begs to become his underling. After some insistence and flattery, Oga ends up accepting his company. He also admires Furuichi, to the latter's delight, calling him "General Furuichi", for being the only man able to follow Oga. His plot role so far has been mostly comic relief and as an information source on the Six Knights.

Yamamura's girlfriend and classmate and an easy-going, lighthearted girl who quickly gets on good terms with Kunieda and Oga, even rooting for them in their fight against the Six Knights.

A spellmaster, a human who made a contract with a demon and becomes capable of using their powers, who is assigned to Oga's class. The difference between simple contractors and spellmasters is not clear and may be just a matter of experience. It is not known which demon made the contract, but it is implied to be a member of the royal family, as Hilda recognises the seal on his hand. He already had sealed the contract when he was in High School. He wears a bandana, long, black dishevelled hair and is always seen smoking. He is also quite perverted, shamelessly flirting with Kunieda and her subordinates, peeking up Hilda's skirt and also groping her breasts during their fight.

Saotome is the most powerful human described so far, although Oga may have matched him recently. He shows superhuman strength, speed and agility and is able to defeat several uncontracted demons with relative ease, including Hilda. He can use the Nadeshiko movement as Oga, but in a much larger scale, even splitting hillocks with it. It is implied that he has access to information from the demon world that even Hilda is not privy to. His control of his demonic powers was initially much greater than Oga's, and he can gauge the amount of energy he wants to use with precision, as seen by the fine control he has over the size and expansion of his own tattoo. Recently, he offered to teach Tojo how to fight a demon. It seems that he is acting on Genma Isurugi's orders: in the school, he is appointed as homeroom teacher to the Ishiyama students. After overcoming some resistance from Oga, Saotome teaches him how to use Beel's powers to fight other demons.

Some of Saotome's deeds go beyond simple enhancement of human physical skills: he can perform authentic feats of magic in the same fashion as Oga, such as sealing a dimensional hole open by Oga in the roof of the volleyball court and dispatching Behemoth's subordinates (see below) back to the demon world. When he uses his powers to seal the hole, the pulse of energy is felt, other than by Hilda, by six characters that are thus identified as possessing of notable strength for humans: Oga, two Touhoushinki (Kunieda and Tojo) and three Horsemen (Izuma, Miki and Shizuka). This event seems to set apart which humans in the story are fit for celebrating contracts with demons: Oga is already a contractor, being chosen by baby Beel; Izuma has demon blood in him and Kunieda is soon targeted by a demon for this very purpose.

Later, it is revealed that Saotome took part in some sort of war in the Demon World, and was a respected champion in that conflict. Ikaruga Suiten (see below) states that a limitation to Saotome's use of demon power, as opposed to Oga's, is that Saotome does not master Black Techs and thus cannot allow himself to merge with his demon.

Genma Isurugi
St. Ishiyama's Headmaster. An old man who knows of the demon world and, like Saotome, has access to information from there. He also offers protection to young people who are trying to cope with their demon powers by accepting them into his school. It is implied that Izuma is not the only descendant of demons currently enrolled at St. Ishiyama. He can feel demonic energy like Saotome and realises immediately when members of the 34th Pillar Squad (see below) arrive in the city. When fighting, his muscles expand quickly and he can launch very powerful strikes.

The first homeroom teacher of the Ishiyama class at St. Ishiyama prior to Saotome's arrival. Bespectacled, and at first overconfident on his ability to exert control over the thugs, he quickly fails to do so, when his attempts to intimidate them by means of authority, strength or coercion backfire badly. He later becomes attached to the group and supports them in the volleyball match, and is greatly disappointed to be replaced by Saotome.

A teacher in charge of student life, he sustains an impassive expression when dealing with pupils and tries to enforce his authority over Ishiyama students, first by threatening to expel Kunieda and Oga if they do not restrain their colleagues; later, by deciding on the expulsion of Oga, all the Touhoushinki, Furuichi and Natsume. However, he is outmaneuvered by Himekawa and ends up agreeing to the condition of removing the Horsemen's authority in case Ishiyama win the volleyball match, which they do. During Kiriya and Teimou's plot, he keeps his cool and even threatens expulsion in case either of the opposing sides resorts to violence.

Demon World
In the Beelzebub series, the demon world bears little resemblance to Christian or Jewish Demonologies. It is described as a realm in another dimension that is inhabited by many fantastic creatures and ruled by the royal dynasty of the Beelzebubs. From what can be inferred, the way of life has traits of common medieval fiction stories, but at the same time contemporary devices such as video games are known. However, the technology seems to be slightly behind the human world's, as Lord En (see below) is shocked by how advanced a PlayStation 2 is. The Beelzebubs' power is not uncontested, though: there are rogues and thieves and other people living outside of the royal family's authority. Demons still have an intent to destroy Man, as in Western belief; however, they are not immortal and can be killed in a similar way to humans, although they are more powerful. They may have many different shapes, but most of those who interact with Oga and other humans are also human-like, with minor anatomical differences in some cases, such as reptilian ears, fangs or spots on the skin.

The Devil King and Baby Beel's father. He is referred to as the third Beelzebub in chapter 48, so his full name may be Kaiser de Emperana Beelzebub III. He is a tall figure with long light-colored hair, wearing a helmet with two prominent, cartoonish horns and dressed in a long cape, who is always pictured from behind. His main characteristic, often alluded to in the course of the series, is being "extremely random". He spends his time mostly playing karaoke or video games, and has twice decided to destroy mankind out of pure whim: however, his schedule full of ceremonies and engagements prevents him from going on his own, and thus he whimsically decides to send his children: first Baby Beel, then Lord En.

A former imperial doctor to the royal family. He has the appearance of a tall, dark-haired man, but in the human world he takes up a provisional body due to his contempt of humans. This body is similar to one of Lamia's (see below) "muumuu" pets, a random mass with a pair of eyes that can float above the ground at times. He is able to read minds. A highly skilled physician, he is first brought by Hilda in order to diagnose baby Beel, and is able to devise a cure for the kid by reestablishing his bond to Oga. He comes back later to treat Hilda's wound. Foras and Saotome know each other, but the nature of the acquaintance, as Saotome's connection to the demon world, is currently unknown. His name is probably a reference to a demon of the same name. It is later revealed that Forcas current position is as doctor to the 34th Pillar Squad (see below).

A demon doctor who is very small. Lamia comes to the human world in her capacity as Dr. Rachmaninorr's assistant to help in treating baby Beel and later takes care of Oga's wounds after a confrontation with a demon. Like her boss, she can read minds, even baby Beel's, although she does not do it very often. She disapproves of Oga as Beel's parent, but reluctantly accepts it after his battle with Tojo. Although she seemed cold and hostile upon their first encounter, she thanks Oga for saving her after the incident in the demon world. She is very protective of Baby Beel and greatly respects Hilda, whom she refers to as "Hilda-nee-san." Her name is possibly an allusion to the mythological demon. Later in the series, she seeks Furuichi's help to find Lord En on Hilda's request. Furuichi suspects her of being a tsundere character. Lamia carries a pistol loaded with bullets containing demonic concoctions that can erase memories, force a person to do one's bidding or, in the case of Oga, trap him in a psychic loop. She is always accompanied by two small muumuu pets, one of which sits atop her head and often mimics her mood. Her age is unspecified, but her appearance is that of a preteen girl. Her mother is general Laymia of the 34th Pillar Squad (see below).

Alaindelon's beautiful daughter. Like her father, she is a transdimensional demon. A naturalist, she is currently stationed in the outskirts of Vlad's Haunt to study its ecosystem. She seems to be a bit foolish and absent-minded.

Lord En
Baby Beel's elder brother, sent by their father to help in destroying mankind. He is a very spoiled, pompous child and a video game addict. However, he seems to be extremely powerful, on par with his brother: if he cries, he will destroy everything up to a radius of 15 km in a sea of flames. An example of this happens in chapter 138, when he incinerates Akumano Academy (see below). He is also lazy and a crybaby, and is not as interested in destroying mankind as he is in clearing video games. Lord En seems to have a crush on Lamia and even calls her his wife, but she does not reciprocate. His juvenile canine teeth are actually fangs and the left one is slightly longer. He has green hair like his brother and is attended by three wet nurses:

Yolda is Hilda's younger sister and bears a strong resemblance to her. She carries a mop and uses it as a weapon much as Hilda uses her umbrella. The two seem to have an unsettled score and Yolda positively despises Hilda. She is also able to move very quickly and knocks Furuichi and Kunieda out easily. In contrast to Hilda, she has a femme fatale attitude. It is later revealed that she is a dimensional transfer demon like Alaindelon; her powers are said to be even greater than his, and she is able to distort dimensions and create sections of space detached from the physical world. Despite not being as competent as Hilda, she is fiercely loyal to Lord En, to the point of allowing herself to be imprisoned so she can stay close to her master.

Sachura wears her long black hair in two braids and appears to be the youngest of the nurses. She brings Lord En his drinks. Her weapons are two pistols.

Isabella leads the three nurses and has a cold, serious attitude. She wears glasses and carries a book of incantations that she uses to cater for Lord En's needs and whims.

Athrun
A powerful demon who appears for the first time in Angelica's house in the demon world. At first, he appears to be working on commission of the thieves' leader, but later he saves Oga and the others from being stomped flat by the giant baby Beel. He considers killing Oga when he seems unable to summon Beel to him and revert him to his original size, but Oga instinctively succeeds in doing so and Athrun changes his mind.
He is able to teleport himself by using stones that Lamia describes as byproducts of dimensional transfer demons, and is last seen reporting to mysterious parties on his encounter with Oga. He is then told by his superiors that he will meet Oga again in the human world.

Postman
A demon who delivers letters to the human world. He has long blond hair and is constantly smiling. Because his method of delivery consists of letting the package fall from the sky, usually causing some damage, he tends to be on the receiving end of Oga's hostility, with comic effect.

Tama-and-Pochi
Called by Hilda a "demon of embodiment", Tama-and-Pochi is an artificial demon made by the Great Demon Lord to protect a painting he made of Baby Beel's mother, known in the human world as "the demon's portrait". Tama-and-Pochi has the appearance of a teenage girl, uses a crescent moon-shaped sickle as a weapon and her power is the "demon script": those under its effect see their companion's defects amplified a hundredfold, which causes any party of people greater than two who sees the painting to devolve into man-on-man fights until there is only one left standing. This did not work on Oga and Beel, though, because they don't believe they have any defects and actually rejoice on what would disgust others.
Tama-and-Pochi is nearly as random as her creator, and can actually fall asleep on the spot, even while standing, and while asleep she often urinates on herself.

Mrs Iris
Beel's mother. An extremely beautiful woman whom Hilda originally served and considers an older sister. The Demon's Portrait, painted by the Demon King, is a picture of hers. Her whereabouts haven't been revealed yet.

34th Pillar Squad
A military division that works directly under Lord En. It consists of ten divisions, each one commanded by a "Pillar Head" (or Lieutenant General), who may have one or more "Pillars" (or Brigadier General) under their command, for a total of 24. Each Pillar has 15 "Peons" under them. Ranking officers wear black, peons wear white leather coats. Pillar Heads' names are normally borrowed from mythical or literary dragons or dragon-like creatures; they have special powers and can be distinguished by their fringed epaulettes. Pillars have alphabetic names and are tattooed, each tattoo representing a letter of the demonic alphabet. Their loyalty and deference to En is unwavering, sometimes with comic effect.

Behemoth is the squad's founder and its former leader with the rank of general of the army. At least in the human world, he has the appearance of an eccentric, oddly dressed old man. He is named after the biblical beast. In contrast to the Demon Lord, who could not care less whether Beel or En is the one to destroy humanity, Behemoth wants En to prevail and be advanced as the rightful heir to the throne. He then sends his subordinates to the human world in order to kill Beel's contractor. Later, he builds a school (Akumano Academy, "Akumano" meaning "demon's") for Lord En in the place of the destroyed Ishiyama and populates it both with the other members of the squad and with Ishiyama's lesser thugs, who underwent some sort of brainwashing in the process. After the Squad is defeated by Oga and Akumano is burnt by En's crying, Behemoth and the rest of the Squad remain stuck in the human world.

Jabberwock, named after Lewis Carroll's character, is Behemoth's son and just appointed successor as leader of the squad, with the same rank as his father. He has a massive constitution and a big transversal scar across his face. His attitude is haughty and he immediately dismisses Oga as an unworthy opponent on first meeting him. Jabberwock then proceeds to have his pet dragon Sodom (described as a "Grand Bahamut") kidnap Hilda by swallowing her alive. He seems to respect Saotome and wishes to face him in battle, but is more reluctant than his father to be under the leadership of Lord En's, to whom he refers as a stupid kid. His recklessness has earned him the nickname "Crazy Dragon". Jabberwock is very powerful; the Zebub Emblem and even Super Milk Time seem to be ineffective against him, but he develops a little amount of respect for Oga on fighting him for the first time. His nasty temper got him expelled from the squad at a point, but he was readmitted by his father. Jabberwock is eventually defeated by Oga and Beel after a fierce battle. He has his own squadron, whose members seem to have a bad reputation with the rest of the Squad due to their lack of honour. They include three personal Pillars:

Lunana is a dark-skinned, stocky woman with a detached expression who seems to be able to move extremely quickly.

Lindworm wears a chest plate and has long dark hair, as well as a mischievous attitude.

Kirin has fair hair, wields two batons fitted with blades and is blindfolded.

A number of Pillar Heads have been presented, as well as some Pillars working under them.

Naga is first introduced alongside Graffel when the latter attacks Izuma and Tojo, but maintains a detached attitude that contrasts with Graffel's violence. He rushes with Graffel to Hecadoth's aid against Saotome, only to be dispatched to the demon world by the teacher. It is later revealed that he is known as the Water Dragon King and his power is way above Hecatos' and Graffel's. His black aura often takes the shape of a dragon. He is probably named after the Hindu deity. Naga is eventually defeated by Oga and Beel's Super Milk Time.

Hecadoth is the 8th Pillar. He begins his attack on Oga and the others by imprisoning Kunieda with the intention to use her blood to forge a demon contract; it is understood that the already powerful demons increase their power in the human world considerably if they find a contractor. It seems that the contract itself is not necessarily consensual.

However, Hecadoth looks down on Hilda and Oga and, instead of proceeding to seal the contract, he allows them to have a shot at him.  The two succeed in surprising him with Oga's Zebub Blast, while Hilda releases Kunieda. Hecadoth, who had planned for that, uses the opportunity to impale Hilda with his spear, putting her out of combat. He then proceeds to face Oga, and is only prevented from killing him by Saotome's intervention, whereby he is sent back to the demon world. His spear fails to kill Hilda thanks to Kunieda's first aid and Dr. Rachmaninoff's timely intervention, but it puts the demon maid out of action for some time, since it has the property of diffusing demonic powers around the wound.

Later, Hecadoth meets Hilda again, but this time she is at the top of her powers and unhindered, and attacks him fiercely. Before he can retaliate, Oga arrives from his training with Saotome and takes up the fight from Hilda. He defeats Hecadoth easily and the demon is the first victim of the Zebub Emblem.

Graffel, the 7th Pillar, also works under Naga and is first presented when he interrupts Tojo and Izuma's fight, having been attracted to it by Izuma's demonic energy. He is very proud of his power and considers humans and lower demons inferior, and nearly kills Tojo and Izuma before sensing Saotome's attack on Hecatos and rushing to his aid. He is sent back to the demon world by Saotome. He is later the first victim of Oga and Beel's Super Milk Time.

Graffel is general Yata's younger brother, although Yata considers him a good-for-nothing. Despite this assessment, his loyalty to Lord En is such that, alongside Hecadoth and Naga, he takes the initiative to kill Oga without authorisation from the Squad's leadership, and is ready to give his life to attain that goal. After their second defeat, he and Hecadoth are seen imprisoned in Akumano High's dungeon.

Laymia is a Pillar Head and Lamia's mother. She seems to be one of Behemoth's closest advisors. Although her daughter sides with Beel, she is one of the main architects in the plot to kill Oga and deprive the demon baby of his Contractor. She is a tall woman with an unfathomable expression who is seen heading a meeting of the Squad's officers.

Agiel, the first Pillar, is a cheerful, slim girl in Laymia's division who is extremely strong and violent and who becomes obsessed with Aoi after being defeated by her.

Odonel, the 14th Pillar and also under Laymia, is a short man whose head is completely covered in bandages and who is first shown with his arms tied up to his torso.

Quetzalcoatl is Harlequin-like in appearance and has the ability to control people's minds. He uses this power on Lord En's orders to turn all of Ishiyama's former students who did not go to St. Ishiyama into slaves to corner Furuichi and the others. He then challenges the Ishiyama gang to a game with their lives on the line. He is named after the Mesoamerican deity.

Basilisk is a large, scarred, hirsute man who is seen smoking a cigar with his feet on the table at the meeting Laymia headed. His weapon of choice is a giant ax, and he has the power to immobilise his opponents if they look at him in the eye. Oga falls for the trick, but Beel stops the ax and both defeat Basilisk using Super Milk Time. His power and name are adapted from the Greek mythological monster.

Salamander is a fair-haired young man whose light demeanour and warm smile contrast with the offhand way he discusses executing Graffel and Hecatos for disobedience. His power, Lost Prominence, is a fire that burns memories instead of matter, and which can also be used for mind control. His namesake is the mediaeval mythical creature.
 
Yata is a young swordsman seen in the meeting headed by Laymia. In the occasion he proposed executing Graffel and Hecatos – even though Graffel is his brother – for attacking Oga without an express order to do so. His power consists of wielding his katana at supersonic speed. His name is probably a derivation of the Japanese deity.

In addition to these characters, the meeting mentioned above introduced Vritra, a woman with a cold attitude. Tojo's return in chapter 132 pits him against Yinglong, a tall man with a ponytail. Ananta, first glimpsed in chapter 123, is a girl with odango hair who battles Kunieda on chapter 134.

Finally, a number of Pillars have made quick appearances. Zela, the 24th, is a tall blond man introduced with Agiel and Odonel while standing sentry at Akumano Academy. When Oga attacks Akumano High, he meets and defeats Din (4th), a young man with shoulder-length black hair; Kne (10th), who wears a French-style beret; Labed (11th), who sports dreadlocks; Wasboga (21st), who wears sideboards; Xoblah (22nd), a plump man who is knocked out by Oga on first sight; and Yshiel (23rd), a blond swordswoman with a patch over her left eye. Tojo then defeats Cemor (3rd), a man with light, pointy hair; and Nebak (13th), a short man with an African lion mask. Kunieda faces Elim (5th), a little girl in oversized clothes who wields a cane; Fabas (6th), a punk who fights with two backswords; Pamiel (15th), a Hippie who uses a dagger; and Tiriel (19th), a long-haired blonde who uses two swords. Oga meets Schethalim (18th), a light-haired man ; and Vabam (20th), an anthropomorphic dog; both of whom use pistols.

Others

Oga's older sister and the first leader of the Red Tails. A young adult now, she is nevertheless still violent and scares even Oga and Furuichi, but seems to get along with Hilda very well. As Oga's parents, she seems easily to accept the strange events happening around her brother ever since Hilda and Baby Beel arrived, even when blatantly supernatural beings like Forkas appear (she is seen being massaged by him in chapter 38). She is under the assumption that Hilda, Beel and the others are from Macao (apparently having mistaken it from the word Makai, the Japanese word for the demons' dwelling).

Reiji Kiriya
Also known as the Viper, he is a vicious thug who is at the centre of Oga and Miki's story. His cunning and thirst for revenge gain him the leadership of Teimou Academy's skinheads, who are driven by him to take St. Ishiyama hostage in order to get back at Oga. He wears the hair in black power style and his face has three vertical scars carved by Oga using Kiriya's own nails, in retribution for his attack on Miki.

His plan for revenge ultimately backfires when the Red Tails and the Six Knights capture his underlings and Oga and Miki defeat Teimou's shadow group (see below). After being badly injured by Oga's Zebub Blast, he hallucinates and takes Oga himself for a devil, and crawls away in mortal fear.

Teimou's shadow group
The four strongest fighters of Teimou Academy, they ruled over Teimou from the shadows under Kiriya's orders while the latter was in hiding. They are defeated by Oga and Miki, and later go to the Shingetsu Temple to become stronger and get back at St. Ishiyama, only to find Oga already there and be badly beaten again. They are nevertheless taken in by Kunieda's grandfather and begin their training alongside Oga, in what seems to be a temporary truce.

Kotaro Mikagami wears a jumper with a hood and several piercings and rings. He is able to pull several punches of great strength in a matter of seconds. He later develops a crush on Aoi Kunieda, exploited in the story for comedic effect.

Unsho Onizuka is very heavily built and relies on sheer strength to overcome his opponents. He and Mikagami are defeated by Oga in one punch.

Kosei Kuroki is a plain skinhead who wields a three-section staff. He is able to repel an attack from Miki, but is later defeated by his Black Owl Killer.

Takumi Dezaki is a bespectacled, homosexual man and a very capable fighter who deals a heavy blow on Miki. He is not directly defeated by Miki, but is caught in Oga's Zebub Blast directed at Kiriya. He seems to have a crush on Mikagami and is jealous of the latter's interest in Kunieda.

Ittousai Kunieda

Kunieda's grandfather and instructor, the master of the Shingetsu martial arts style is a strong old man who sports long white hair and a moustache. He has a violent personality and, on meeting Oga for the first time, drags him to a brief spar, and is actually victorious. Seeing potential in Oga, he offers to train him if he wants to become stronger.
When Oga decides to take his offer, Kunieda smiles mischievously and begins by ordering Oga to perform a number of household chores, to his great dismay. Later he takes up Teimou's shadow group and leads them all into a training excursion, first ordering them to break stones with their bare hands. He is a very stern man with a hair-trigger temper, and adopts an attitude of fighting first, asking questions later.
Not only does he know about demons and the demon world, but he also recognises Oga as a contractor and decides to train him to use demonic powers. He engages Saotome's assistance to this end, much to Oga's dismay. The three adults who know of the demon world so far - Kunieda, Saotome and Isurugi - are united in their goals and are shown together for the first time facing Behemoth.

Kouta Kunieda

Kunieda's little brother. An infant about the same age Beel, the two first meet in the park when Oga tries to get Beel to fight him. Since Beel is weak when not in contact with Oga, Kouta won the match by simply forcing Beel off the park bench. Since that, the two have developed a rivalry, and in all their encounters so far, Kouta has come out on top. He seems to be somewhat evil like Beel, and to enjoy tormenting the baby demon. Their rivalry is a regular source of comedy in the story. In the anime, the two babies are friendlier towards each other.

Isafuyu Kashino
Voiced by: Saori Hayami
The shy young daughter of the keeper of the Mapputatsu shrine, she is first introduced when Grandpa Kunieda takes Oga and the others to spend the night there. She immediately recognises Baby Beel's true nature and is greatly scared of him. She is described by Kunieda as very spiritually aware and, besides demons, can detect the presence of ghosts and perform exorcisms. Kunieda requests her help to learn how to defeat a demon, with a view to fighting the 34th Pillar Squad, as Oga and Tojo. Isafuyu then introduces Kunieda to the minor god Koma.

Koma
Describing himself as a minor god, Koma is a komainu, although he used the literal meaning of his kind's name to pass for a tengu when he inhabited the Mapputatsu shrine. Although she had never actually seen him, Isafuyu used to borrow his powers whenever she needed to exorcise demons, and took Kunieda to his abode when she requested assistance in this regard.
Koma at first demurs and threatens to sever his agreement with Isafuyu, but becomes interested in Kunieda when he realises she can hear his voice. He then reveals to be quite perverted, trying to get Kunieda to answer questions about her growth and underwear, and revealing that he posed the same questions to Isafuyu in exchange for assistance. Kunieda then becomes enraged and uses her swordstyle to attack Koma's house and force him to reveal himself. He then agrees to help her and becomes her companion, not without showing interest in the Red Tails in the process. In chapter 118 he assumes the form of a gigantic wolf-like creature when he is preparing to fight alongside Kunieda, and in the following chapter he is recognised by Odonel as a 'sicarion' (maybe a corruption of Sicarii), a member of a family of demons who were exiled into the human world after being defeated in war. With his power, Kunieda's swordsmanship is improved enough so that she can face off against Hilda or Agiel.
He can conceal his presence and remain hidden from sight, including from other demons. Even when he is not actively hiding, he can normally be seen or heard only by people who are either spiritually aware or stronger than the average human. A partial exception seems to be Furuichi: despite being extremely weak, he can sense a presence filling the space around Kunieda in chapter 119, even if he doesn't see Koma. He can become visible if he decides so.

Mr Takahashi
A formerly unemployed teacher who inadvertently jumps at the opportunity of a new job and is hired by Behemoth to keep a veneer of normalcy in Akumano Academy by teaching Lord En and the officers, with comic effect.

Ikaruga Suiten
Formerly known as Ikaruga Nazuna, she is a priestess in a temple in the isolated Decapitation Island. Saotome sends Oga and Kunieda to learn from her how to use a demon's powers by merging with them - the skill behind Super Milk Time, known as Black Techs.
Ikaruga is referred to by Saotome and Grandpa Kunieda as unreliable and a snake, but she nevertheless acquiesces to teaching Oga and Kunieda. She moves around in a motorbicycle and can be quite violent when challenged. She can also "shoot" things without a pistol, using her fingers to send some kind of power towards the target.
It is later revealed that Ikaruga and Saotome were colleagues at Ishiyama, and that she used to have feelings for him. Like Kunieda, she led a girl gang. She also knows Kunieda's mother, whom she considers her better in martial skill.

Futaba Kanzaki
Kanzaki's niece by his elder brother. She is an extremely spoiled, four-year-old brat who continually abuses his family and their yakuza underlings. She recruits Beel as her "lackey" and becomes jealous when Chi Aiba (see below) appears with Beel in tow.:

Mugen Kanzaki
Kanzaki's father and the boss of the Ishiyama yakuza. Despite this, he is a doting grandfather who is completely manipulated by Futaba and mainly responsible for spoiling her.

South Chinpira High School
An all-male delinquent school met by Oga and the other thugs during their field trip to Okinawa. They idolise Ishiyama High as the ultimate delinquent school and have emulated many of their customs, to the point of their four strongest thugs calling themselves Touhoushinki: Kamiya wears a chain piercing and copies Kanzaki's taste for yoghurt, Higashiyama is bulky like Tojo, and Himeji wears Hawaii-style shirts and a pompadour like Himekawa. Kunihiko, being a man, does not copy Kunieda but sports his Touhoushinki kanji character on a mask over his mouth. Ironically, on their first meeting, they are unaware that Oga and the others belong to Ishiyama and mutual hostility instantly arises. It is later found that they are considerably weaker than their Ishiyama counterparts.

Izou Aiba
The king of South Chinpira High and Oga's counterpart there. He is immensely strong, apparently on par with Oga but, contrarily to the latter, he does fulfill his role as the leader of his school's thugs, controls them and is followed without question. His temperament is much lighter than Oga's. He feels instantly attracted to Aoi and tries to get a date with her, much to the Red Tails' chagrin. His signature move is an extremely powerful finger flick that can send an average human flying a long distance. However, like Oga, he does not seem to pick fights, but will mercilessly use his power to punish his underlings if they misbehave. When they finally fight, Oga defeats him, but no hard feelings are born afterwards and Aiba tells Aoi he will be back eventually to try and woo her again.

Chiyo Aiba
Izou's little sister, a four-year-old who falls for Beel on first sight. She is quite precocious and can already read, having developed a taste for fortune-telling and the Western Zodiac. She normally travels on a carrier strapped to Izou's back.

San Marx Private Fine Arts Academy
An absurdly posh school in a valley in the countryside, attended by children of political and economical elites from Japan and abroad. Himekawa used to attend it until he was 15.

Kugayama
The student at the top of the social hierarchy at San Marx, always seen escorted by bodyguards in black suits. Kugayama is the only person to have outwitted Himekawa, and there seems to be some bitterness between the two. The student is the current owner of the Demon's Portrait and knows about the existence of demons, having seen Tama-and-Pochi while in possession of the painting. Due to an androginous appearance and the donning of a male uniform, Kugayama was originally thought by Oga and the others to be a man, but they were proven otherwise in chapter 167: Kugayama is a girl and her family and Himekawa's had actually agreed that the two would marry. While she has been in love with him for a long time, his stance on the matter is not yet known. Kugayama is an ambitious woman who wants to rise politically, and is also a skilled fighter, having been able to break the forearm of a man effortlessly.

References

Beelzebub